Vltava is the longest river in the Czech Republic, running southeast along the Bohemian Forest and then north across Bohemia, through Český Krumlov, České Budějovice and Prague, and finally merging with the Labe at Mělník. It is commonly referred to as the "Czech national river".

Both the Czech name  and the German name  are believed to originate from the old Germanic words  'wild water' (compare Latin ).

Course

As it runs through Prague, the river is crossed by 18 bridges (including the Charles Bridge) and covers  within the city. The water from the river was used for drinking until 1912 when the Vinohrady Water Tower ceased pumping operations. It is, however, the source of drinking water in case of failures of or repairs to the water supply from the Želivka and Kárané sources. The Podolí water processing plant is on standby for such cases with the long section of the river upstream of the Podolí plant under the stricter, second degree of pollution prevention regulations.

The Vltava itself originates by a confluence of two streams, the Warm Vltava, which is longer, and the Cold Vltava (Studená Vltava), sourcing in Bavaria. Along its course, Vltava receives many tributaries, the biggest being Otava and Berounka from the left and Lužnice and Sázava from the right side.

Navigation

Between the confluence with the Labe(Elbe) at Mělník and Prague, the river is navigable by vessels of up to  displacement. Most of the river upstream of Prague as far as České Budějovice is navigable by craft of up to  displacement, but such vessels cannot pass the dams at Orlík and Slapy, and are also restricted by a low bridge at Týn nad Vltavou. Work is planned to complete boat lifts, planned for but never completed, at the two dams, and to rebuild the bridge, in order for them to navigate throughout. Much smaller craft, of up to  displacement and under  beam and  air draft, can avoid these obstacles.

Upstream of České Budějovice, the river's section around Český Krumlov (specifically from Vyšší Brod to Boršov nad Vltavou) is a very popular destination for water tourism.

Dams

Nine hydroelectric dams have been built on the Vltava south of Prague to regulate the water flow and generate hydroelectric power, starting in the 1930s. Beginning at the headwaters, these are: Lipno, Lipno II, Hněvkovice, Kořensko, Orlík, Kamýk, Slapy, Štěchovice and Vrané. The Orlík dam supports the largest reservoir on the Vltava by volume, while the Lipno dam retains the largest reservoir by area. The Štěchovice Reservoir is built over the site of St John's Rapids.

Floods
The Vltava basin has flooded multiple times throughout recorded history. Markers have been created along the banks denoting the water line for notable floods in 1784, 1845, 1890, 1940, and the highest of all in 2002.

In August of 2002, the basin was heavily affected by the 2002 European floods when the flooded river killed several people and caused massive damage and disruption along its length, including in Prague. It left the oldest bridge in Prague, Charles Bridge, seriously weakened, requiring years of work to repair.

Prague was again flooded in 2013. Many locations within the Vltava and Elbe basins were left under water, including the Prague Zoo, but metal barriers were erected along the banks of the Vltava to help protect the historic city centre.

References in culture, politics and science
One of the best-known works of classical music by a Czech composer is Bedřich Smetana's Vltava, sometimes called The Moldau in English. It is from the Romantic era of classical music and is a musical description of the river's course through Bohemia.

A minor planet 2123 Vltava discovered in 1973 by Soviet astronomer Nikolai Stepanovich Chernykh is named after the river.

Smetana's symphonic poem also inspired a song of the same name by Bertolt Brecht.  An English version of it, by John Willett, features the lyrics Deep down in the Moldau the pebbles are shifting / In Prague three dead emperors moulder away.

US First Lady Hillary Clinton and US Secretary of State Madeleine Albright met in Prague, strolled through Wenceslas Square with Václav Havel, and took a fourth of July cruise on the Vltava River in summer 1996 after the Velvet Revolution.

See also
 Moldavite

References

External links 

 

 
 
Rivers of the Central Bohemian Region
Rivers of the South Bohemian Region
Geography of Prague